I. D. Fairchild (December 31, 1875 — May 1, 1928) was a Texas legislator that served in the Texas House of Representatives and the Texas Senate. Fairchild died in a motor vehicle accident during his tenure.

Personal life and death
I. D. Fairchild was born on December 31, 1875, in Burke, Texas. Fairchild was a lawyer in Lufkin, Texas, and married Marguerite Gibson Shearer on August 8, 1906. During his time as a state legislator, Fairchild was a resident of Lufkin; however, he and his wife spent much of there time in Austin, Texas. Marguerite Fairchild was very active in the Lufkin community, and served on the County Board of Child Welfare and the Chamber of Commerce of Angelina County, Texas. She also started the first library in Lufkin. The Fairchild's supported governors James E. Ferguson and Miriam A. Ferguson. Additionally, they were also avid supporters of the University of Texas. 

On April 17, 1928, in Dallas, Texas Fairchild was involved in a severe automobile accident, and died on May 1, 1928, from his injuries in a Dallas hospital at the age of 52. His funeral service was held at the First Baptist Church in Lufkin, and was officiated by Rev. A. E. Maness, Luther Anderson, and Rev. W. T. Renfro. A eulogy was given by J. A. Glenn, the division superintendent for the Santa Fe Railway, at the service. His final resting place is Ryan Chapel Cemetery in Diboll, Texas.

On January 18, 1974, Marguerite Gibson Shearer Fairchild died. She is buried at Garden of Memories Cemetery in Lufkin, Texas.

Political career
Fairchild started off his tenure in the Texas Legislature by representing district 10 of the Texas House of Representatives, which at the time was composed of Angelina County and San Augustine County. He was sworn in on April 30, 1915, succeeding Benjamin Alfred Calhoun. He continued to serve district 10 of the Texas House of Representatives until January 11, 1921, when he was succeeded by John Wesley Laird. Fairchild then began serving in the Texas Senate. First, he was sworn to represent to serve district 13 of the Texas Senate on January 11, 1921, succeeding Edgar Earnest Witt, and continued to serve district 13 until January 13, 1925, when he was succeeded by William Robert Poage. During part of the 38th legislature, he was president pro tempore of the Texas Senate. Due to redistricting, he was sworn in on January 13, 1925, to represent district 3 of the Texas Senate succeeding Henry Lewis Darwin. He served district 3 until his death on May 1, 1928, and was later succeeded by William E. Thomason. Throughout his career Fairchild was affiliated with the Democratic Party.

Legacy
I. D. Fairchild State Forest is a state forest located along U.S. Highway 84 in Rusk County, Texas. The park is 2,896 acres.

References

1875 births
1928 deaths
Democratic Party members of the Texas House of Representatives
Democratic Party Texas state senators
Presidents pro tempore of the Texas Senate